Wolverine 2 may refer to:Marvel Comic's Wolverine
 The second version of Wolverine
 Wolverine (comic book)'s issue 2 or volume 2 or second title
 The Wolverine, 2013 film, the second in the Wolverine film series

Other
 M104 Wolverine, the second US Army Wolverine
 USS Wolverine (IX-64), the second USS Wolverine HMS Wolverine (1805), the second HMS Wolverine''

See also
Wolverine (disambiguation)
Wolverine 1 (disambiguation)